The Mobilisation War Cross (Dutch: Mobilisatie-Oorlogskruis) is a Dutch medal awarded for service during World War II.

Establishment and criteria
The Mobilisation War Cross was established on 11 August 1948 by royal decree of Queen Wilhelmina.
Those eligible for the award include military personnel who served for at least six months between 6 April 1939 – 20 May 1940.
However, the Cross can also be awarded to non-military personnel or people who did not serve a full six months, as long as the subject performed military tasks for the Kingdom of the Netherlands.

On 1 December 1992, the original royal decree was rescinded and replaced.

Notable recipients
Freddie Oversteegen
Truus Menger-Oversteegen
Ted Meines
Adriaan Paulen

References

Military awards and decorations of the Netherlands
Awards established in 1948